Denis Bušnja (born 14 April 2000) is a Croatian footballer who plays as a midfielder for Slovenian club Bravo, on loan from Croatian club Rijeka.

Career statistics

Club

Honours
Rijeka
 Croatian Cup: 2019

References

2000 births
Living people
Sportspeople from Varaždin
Association football wingers
Croatian footballers
Croatia youth international footballers
Croatia under-21 international footballers
HNK Rijeka players
NK Istra 1961 players
ŠKF Sereď players
NK Bravo players
Croatian Football League players
Slovak Super Liga players
Slovenian PrvaLiga players
Croatian expatriate footballers
Expatriate footballers in Slovakia
Croatian expatriate sportspeople in Slovakia
Expatriate footballers in Slovenia
Croatian expatriate sportspeople in Slovenia